Unrecognized tribes in the United States are organizations of people who claim to be historically, culturally, and/or genetically related to historic Native American Indian tribes but who are not officially recognized as Indigenous nations by the United States federal government, by individual states, or by recognized Indigenous nations.

The following groups claim to be of Native American, American Indian, Yupik, or Métis heritage by ethnicity, but have no federal recognition through the United States Department of the Interior, Bureau of Indian Affairs Office of Federal Acknowledgment (OFA), United States Department of the Interior Office of the Solicitor (SOL), and are not recognized by any state government in the United States nor by any recognized Indigenous nations. Some of the organizations are regarded as fraudulent and called Corporations Posing as Indigenous Nations (CPAIN).

This list includes some terminated tribes that were previously recognized.

List of unrecognized groups claiming to be American Indian tribes 

Following is a list of groups known to self-identify as Native American tribes but that have been recognized neither by the federal government (Bureau of Indian Affairs) nor by any state nor tribal government.

Alabama 
 Cherokee Nation of Alabama. Letter of Intent to Petition 02/16/1999.
 Cherokee River Indian Community, Moulton, AL. Letter of Intent to Petition 08/03/2000. Receipt of Petition 08/03/2000.
 Chickamauga Cherokee of Alabama.
 Chickmaka Band of the South Cumberland Plateau.
 Coweta Creek Tribe, Phenix City, AL. Letter of Intent to Petition 2/12/2003.
 Eagle Bear Band of Free Cherokees.
 The Langley Band of the Chickamogee Cherokee Indians of the Southeastern United States, aka Langley Band of Chickamogee of Cherokee Indians, Birmingham, AL Letter of Intent to Petition 04/20/1994; Postal service certified letter returned 11/5/1997.
 Phoenician Cherokee II - Eagle Tribe of Sequoyah, Gadsden, AL Letter of Intent to Petition 09/18/2001.
 Principal Creek Indian Nation East of the Mississippi, Florala, AL. Letter of Intent to Petition 11/09/1971. Declined to Acknowledge 06/10/1985 50 FR 14302; certified letter returned "not known" 10/1997.
 Wolf Creek Cherokee Tribe, Inc. of Florida.  Also in Florida.

Alaska 
 Chilkoot Kaagwaantaan Clan, Haines, AK. Letter of Intent to Petition 4/22/1997.
 Five Landless Alaska Tlingit communities.  These Tlingit communities were omitted from the Alaska Native Claims Settlement Act and received neither land nor subsistence rights under the Act.
 Katalla-Chilkat Tlingit Tribe of Alaska, Juneau, AK. Letter of Intent to Petition 02/02/1995; certified letter returned by P.O. 10/1997.
 Knugank, Dillingham, AK. Letter of Intent to Petition 1/7/1999.
 Qutekcak Native Tribe, Seward, AK. Letter of Intent to Petition 2/13/2002. Receipt of Petition 2/13/2002.
 Tsimshian Tribal Council, Ketchikan, AK. Letter of Intent to Petition 07/02/1978.

Arizona 
 American Cherokee Confederacy
 Arizona Cherokee Pioneers
 Barrio Pascua - a village of Yaqui on the Arizona-Mexico border region.
 Chiricahua Apache Ndeh Nation, Silver City, AZ
 The United Cherokee Nation (UCN) – Western National Office. Also in Georgia. Supposed "clans" organized in these areas, often calling themselves as "Cherokee Nation of ....": Alabama, Alaska, Alberta, Arizona (Georgia, Nevada), Arkansas, California, Colorado (New Mexico, Utah), Connecticut, Cyprus, Delaware, Florida, Hawaii, Idaho (Montana), Indiana, Kentucky, Louisiana (Mississippi), Maine, Maryland, Massachusetts, Michigan, Missouri (Kansas), Nebraska (Iowa), New Hampshire, New Jersey, New York, North Carolina, North Dakota, Ohio, Oklahoma, Oregon, Pennsylvania, Rhode Island, South Carolina, South Dakota, Tennessee, Texas, Vermont, Virginia, Washington, West Virginia, Wisconsin (Illinois (Chicago and Metropolis branches), Minnesota) and Wyoming.

Arkansas 
 Amonsoquath Tribe of Cherokee, Van Buren, MO
 Arkansas Band of Western Cherokee (formerly Western Arkansas Cherokee Tribe), Sulphur Springs, AR. Letter of Intent to Petition 04/07/1998.
 Arkansas Cherokee (also known as Chickamauga Cherokee of Arkansas), Conway, AR. Letter of Intent to Petition 03/21/2008.
 Arkansas Cherokee Nation, Conway, AR
 Arkansas White River Cherokee (also in Florida), Lady Lake, FL
 Central Tribal Council, Mammoth Springs, AR. Letter of Intent to Petition 01/21/2003. Receipt of Petition 01/21/2003.
 Cherokee Nation West of Missouri and Arkansas (formerly Cherokee Nation West or Southern Band of the Eastern Cherokee Indians of Arkansas and Missouri). Letter of Intent to Petition 5/11/1998. Also in Missouri.
 Cherokee-Choctaw Nation of St. Francis and Black Rivers, Paragould, AR. Letter of Intent to Petition 08/01/2006.
 Confederated Western Cherokees of Arkansas.
 Lost Cherokee of Arkansas and Missouri, Conway, AR. Letter of Intent to Petition 02/10/1999; letter returned, marked "in dispute" between two different addresses.
 Lost Cherokee of Arkansas and Missouri (I). Faction in Conway, AR.
 Lost Cherokee of Arkansas and Missouri (II). Faction in Dover, AR.
 Manataka American Indian Council, Hot Springs, AR
 Neches Tribe – Cherokee Nation, Hot Springs, AR
 Northern Cherokee Nation. Dissolved into three groups:
 Chickamauga Cherokee Nation (I), also known as Chickamauga Cherokee Nation MO/AR White River Band and as White River Band of Northern Cherokee Nation of Missouri and Arkansas. Also in Missouri and Oklahoma. There is also a Chickamauga Cherokee Nation White River Band (II) in Oklahoma.
 Northern Cherokee Nation of the Old Louisiana Territory, Columbia, MO. Letter of Intent to Petition 2/19/1992. Also in Missouri.
 Kanasas (Awi Akta) District of NCNOLT.
 Oklahoma (Ani Tsi Na) District of the NCNOLT.
 Northern Cherokee Tribe of Indians of Missouri and Arkansas. Letter of Intent to Petition 07/26/1985. Also in Missouri.
 Old Settler Cherokee Nation of Arkansas. Letter of Intent to Petition 9/17/1999.
 Ouachita Cherokee of Cherokee Nation West, Mena, AR
 Ozark Mountain Cherokee Tribe of Arkansas and Missouri, Melbourne, AR. Letter of Intent to Petition 10/19/1999. Receipt of Petition 10/19/1999. Also in Missouri.
 Red Nation of the Cherokee, Augusta, KS Also in Kansas.
 Revived Ouachita Indians of Arkansas and America, Story, AR. Letter of Intent to Petition 04/25/1990.
 Sac River and White River Bands of the Chickamauga-Cherokee Nation of Arkansas and Missouri Inc. (formerly Northern Chickamauga Cherokee Nation of Arkansas and Missouri), Chandler, OK. Letter of Intent to Petition 09/05/1991. Also in Missouri.
 Western Cherokee of Arkansas and Louisiana Territories. Letter of Intent to Petition 10/05/2001. Also in Missouri.
 Western Cherokee Nation of Arkansas and Missouri, Mena, AR. Letter of Intent to Petition 05/01/1998. Also in Missouri.
 Western Cherokee Nation of Arkansas and Missouri, Conway, AR. Separate from the Mena group, this Conway group was represented by Cary G. Kuykendall.

California 
Alexander Valley Mishewal Wappo
 Alexander Valley Rancheria, formerly federally recognized, terminated on August 1, 1961
 band of Ohlone/Costanoan Indians (formerly Amah Band of Ohlone/Costanoan Indians). Letter of Intent to Petition 09/18/1990.
Amonsoquath Tribe of Cherokee. Letter of Intent to Petition.  Also in Missouri.
Ani Yvwi Yuchi (Cherokee). Letter of Intent to Petition 7/31/1996.
Antelope Valley Paiute Tribe (a.k.a. Antelope Valley Indian Community). Letter of Intent to Petition 07/09/1976.
Atahun Shoshones of San Juan Capistrano
Barbareño/Ventureño Band of Mission Indians. Letter of Intent to Petition 01/17/2002. Receipt of Petition 01/17/2002.
Big Meadows Lodge Tribe
Binay Yeha Noha Bear Clan Tribe Letter of Intent to Petition 08/31/2020
 Cache Creek Rancheria, formerly federally recognized, terminated on April 11, 1961
Calaveras County Band of Miwuk Indians, Letter of Intent to Petition 08/31/2001. also Calaveras Band of Miwuk Indians, West Point
California Indian Council/Lulapin
Callattakapa Choctaw Tribe. Letter of Intent to Petition 07/13/2004.
Calusa-Seminole Nation. Letter of Intent to Petition 04/28/1998.
Cherokee Nation Heritage Organization of California.
The Cherokees of California.
Chilula Tribe
The Chiricahua Tribe of California. Letter of Intent to Petition 04/24/2003.
Choctaw Allen Tribe. Letter of Intent to Petition 10/20/2003.
Choinumni Council. Letter of Intent to Petition 07/14/1988. Certified letter undeliverable 10/1997
Chukchansi Yokotch Tribe of Mariposa CA. Letter of Intent to Petition 05/25/1993.
Chumash Council of Bakersfield. Letter of Intent to Petition 10/18/2005.
Coastal Band of Chumash. Letter of Intent to Petition 03/25/1982.
Coastal Gabrieleño Diegueño Band of Mission Indians. Letter of Intent to Petition 3/18/1997.
Coastanoan Band of Carmel Mission Indians. Letter of Intent to Petition 09/16/1988.
Colfax-Todds Valley Consolidated Tribe of the Colfax Rancheria
Confederation of Aboriginal Nations
Costanoan Rumsen Carmel Tribe. Letter of Intent to Petition 08/24/1994.
Costanoan Tribe of Santa Cruz and San Juan Bautista Missions. Letter of Intent to Petition 5/11/1999; Letter of Intent withdrawn 5/10/2000.
Costoanoan Ohlone Rumsen-Mutsen Tribe. Letter of Intent to Petition 12/07/1994.
Diegueño Band of San Diego Mission Indians. Letter of Intent to Petition 10/15/2003.
The Displaced Elem Lineage Emancipated Members (a.k.a. DELEMA). Letter of Intent to Petition 05/11/1998.
Dumna-Wo-Wah Tribal Government (formerly Dumna Tribe of Millerton Lake). Letter of Intent to Petition 01/22/2002. Receipt of Petition 01/22/2002 as "Dumna Tribal Council."
Dunlap Band of Mono Indians (a.k.a. Mono Tribal Council of Dunlap). Letter of Intent to Petition 01/04/1984. Letter of Intent withdrawn 7/2/2002; Letter of Intent to Petition 8/9/2005.
 El Dolorado Rancheria, formerly federally recognized, terminated on July 16, 1966
Eshom Valley Band of Michahai and Wuksachi. Letter of Intent to Petition 05/24/2005.
 Esselen/Coastanoan Tribe of Monterey County (formerly Esselen Tribe of Monterey Council). Letter of Intent to Petition 11/16/1992; withdrawn 11/15/1996.
Fernandeño/Tataviam Tribe. Letter of Intent to Petition 04/24/1995.
Gabrieleño Band of Mission Indians of California. Letter of Intent to Petition 11/03/1998. Recognized only as band of the Gabrieliño-Tongva Tribe.
Gabrieliño/Tongva Indians of California Tribal Council. Letter of Intent to Petition 08/14/1997.  Recognized only as band of the Gabrieliño-Tongva Tribe.
Gabrieliño/Tongva Nation. Letter of Intent to Petition 03/21/1994. Recognized only as band of the Gabrieliño-Tongva Tribe.
 Gabrieliño-Tongva Tribe, also known as the San Gabriel Band of Mission Indians. In 1994, the State of California recognized the Gabrieliño-Tongva Tribe in Assembly Joint Resolution 96, Resolution Chapter 146 of the Statutes of 1994; however, it has no state-recognized tribes today. The tribe, however, has broken into several factions, some of whom are seeking federal recognition as separate tribes. The three largest and most prominent factions are:
Gabrieliño-Tongva Tribe (or the San Gabriel Band of Mission Indians, as it was historically referred to)
Gabrieleño/Tongva Tribal Council of San Gabriel
Gabrieleño/Tongva Nation (a.k.a. Gabrieliño/Tongva Tribe of the Los Angeles Basin).
In past years, bills have been introduced in the California legislature to create a Gabrieliño-Tongva Reservation for the tribe and grant the tribe gaming rights; however, these bills failed to make it to the Governor's desk. In their most recent attempt, Senate Bill 1134 introduced on January 30, 2008 would have created the Gabrieliño/Tongva Reservation without giving the tribe gaming rights. However, when the principal author, Senator Oropeza, found out that the tribe would use the reservation for leverage to obtain gaming rights, she pulled her sponsorship of the bill.
Honey Lake Maidu. Letter of Intent to Petition 06/01/2000. Receipt of Petition 06/01/2000.
Hownonquet Community Association
Indian Canyon Band of Coastanoan/Mutsun Indians. Letter of Intent to Petition 06/09/1989.
Independence 14 (Miranda Allotment)
Indian Cultural Organization
 Indian Ranch Rancheria, formerly federally recognized, terminated on September 22, 1964
Juaneño Band of Mission Indians, Acjachemen Nation (II). (Copycat band) Letter of Intent to Petition 3/8/1996. Decline to Acknowledge 12/03/2007 (72 FR 67951). 
Kawaiisu Tribe of the Tejon Indian Reservation
Kern Valley Indian Community. Letter of Intent to Petition 02/27/1979.
Konkow Valley Band of Maidu. Letter of Intent to Petition 08/20/1998.
Maidu Nation. Letter of Intent to Petition 1/6/1977
 Mark West Rancheria, formerly federally recognized, terminated on April 11, 1961
Melochundum Band of Tolowa Indians
Mishkanaka (Chumash)
 Mission Creek Reservation, formerly federally recognized, terminated on July 14, 1970
Miwok Tribe
Monachi Indian Tribe. Letter of Intent to Petition 10/14/2004.
Mono Lake Indian Community. Letter of Intent to Petition 07/09/1976.
Muwekma Ohlone Tribe (formerly Ohlone/Costanoan Muwekma Tribe a.k.a. Muwekma Indian Tribe: Costanoan/Ohlone Indian Families of the San Francisco Bay). Letter of Intent to Petition 05/09/1989.  Declined to Acknowledge 9/17/2002 (67 FR 58631); decision effective 12/16/2002.
Nashville Eldorado Miwok Tribe. Letter of Intent to Petition 11/09/2004.
 Nevada City Rancheria, formerly federally recognized, terminated on September 22, 1961
Nor-Rel-Muk Nation (formerly Hayfork Band; formerly Nor-El-Muk Band of Wintu Indians).  Letter of Intent to Petition 01/05/1984.
North Fork Band of Mono Indians. Letter of Intent to Petition 09/07/1983.
North Valley Yokut Tribe. Letter of Intent to Petition 09/22/2000. Receipt of Petition 09/22/2000.
Northern Band of Mono-Yokuts. Letter of Intent to Petition 08/22/2006.
Northern Maidu Maidu Tribe
Northfolk Band of Mono Indians
Ohlone/Costanoan - Esselen Nation. Letter of Intent to Petition 12/03/1992.
Paskenta Band of Momlaki Indians
Rancho San Timoteo Band of Serrano Indians
 Ruffeys Rancheria, formerly federally recognized, terminated on April 11, 1961
San Cayetano Band of Cahuilla Indians or the Montoya Band of Cahuilla Indians
Salinan Nation (a.k.a. Salinan Chumash Nation). Letter of Intent to Petition 10/10/1989.
Salinan Tribe of Monterey & San Luis Obispo Counties. Letter of Intent to Petition 11/13/1993.
San Fernando Band of Mission Indians (formerly Ish Panesh United Band of Indians; formerly Oakbrook Chumash People a.k.a. Ish Panesh Band of Mission Indians, Oakbrook Park Chumash). Letter of Intent to Petition 05/25/1995.
San Luis Rey Band of Mission Indians. Letter of Intent to Petition 10/18/1984.
Shasta Nation. Letter of Intent to Petition 05/28/1982.
She-Bel-Na Band of Mendocino Coast Pomo Indians. Letter of Intent to Petition 03/01/2006.
Sierra Foothill Wuksachi Yokuts Tribe. Letter of Intent to Petition 05/11/1999.
Southern Sierra Miwuk Nation (formerly American Indian Council of Mariposa County a.k.a. Yosemite). Letter of Intent to Petition 04/24/1982.
 Strawberry Valley Rancheria, formerly federally recognized, terminated on April 11, 1961
Tehatchapi Tribe of the Tejon Reservation
Tinoqui-Chalola Council of Kitanemuk and Yowlumne Tejon Indians. Letter of Intent to Petition 01/16/1996.
Tolowa Nation. Letter of Intent to Petition 01/31/1983.
Tolowa-Tututni Tribe. Also in Oregon.
Toulumne Algerine Band of Yokut. Letter of Intent to Petition 01/23/2006.
Tuolumne Band of Cherokee Indians.
Traditional Choinuymni Tribe. Letter of Intent to Petition 03/29/2000. Receipt of Petition 03/29/2000.
T'Si-akim Maidu. Letter of Intent to Petition 11/16/1998.
Tsnungwe Council (a.k.a. South Fork Hupa). Letter of Intent to Petition 09/22/1992.
United Hourma Nation, Inc. Letter of Intent to Petition 3/22/1994.
United Lumbee Nation of North Carolina and America. Letter of Intent to Petition 04/28/1980; Declined to Acknowledge 07/02/1985 (50 FR 18746).  Also in North Carolina.
United Maidu Nation. Letter of Intent to Petition 01/06/1977.
Wadatkuht Band of the Northern Paiutes of the Honey Lake Valley. Letter of Intent to Petition 01/26/1995.
Washoe/Paiute of Antelope Valley. Letter of Intent to Petition 07/09/1976.
Winnemem Wintu Tribe
Wintoon Indians. Letter of Intent to Petition 10/26/1984; certified letter returned by P.O. 10/1997.
The Wintoon Tribe of Northern California, Inc.. Letter of Intent to Petition 04/27/2005.
Wintu Indians of Central Valley, California. Letter of Intent to Petition 10/26/1984; certified letter returned by P.O. 10/1997.
Wintu of Shasta-Toyon
Wintu Tribe of Northern California. Letter of Intent to Petition 08/25/1993.
Woodfords Community Council
Wukchumni Council. Letter of Intent to Petition 02/22/1988. Certified letter undeliverable 10/1997.
Xolon Salinan Tribe, Bay Point. Letter of Intent to Petition 09/18/2001.
Yamassee Native American Association of Nations, Van Nuys California
Yokayo Tribe of Indians. Letter of Intent to Petition 03/09/1987. Certified letter returned by P.O. 10/1997
Yosemite Mono Lake Paiute Indian Community. Letter of Intent to Petition 12/06/2005.

Colorado 
 Munsee Thames River Delaware, Manitou Springs, CO. Letter of Intent to Petition 07/22/1977; declined to Acknowledge 01/03/1983 47 FR 50109.
 Council for the Benefit of the Colorado Winnebagoes, Aurora, CO. Letter of Intent to Petition 01/26/1993; certified letter returned "attempted, not known" 11/5/1997.

Connecticut 
 Algonquian Confederacy of the Quinnipiac Tribal Council
 Grasmere Band of Wangunk Indians of Glastonbury, Connecticut (formerly the Pequot Mohegan Tribe, Inc.). Letter of Intent to Petition 4/12/1999.
 The Mohegan Tribe & Nation. Letter of Intent to Petition 10/06/1992.
 Native American Mohegans, Inc. Letter of Intent to Petition 9/19/2002. Receipt of Petition 9/19/2002.
 The Nehantic Tribe and Nation. Letter of Intent to Petition 9/5/1997.
 New England Coastal Schaghticoke Indian Association
 Nipmuc Indian Bands
 Paugussett Tribal Nation of Waterbury, Connecticut. Letter of Intent to Petiton 7/3/2002. Receipt of Petition 7/3/2002.
 Pocasset Wampanoag Indian Tribe, Cheshire, CT. Letter of Intent to Petition 02/01/1995
 Poquonnock Pequot Tribe. Letter of Intent to Petition 7/7/1999.
 Schaghticoke Tribe, Bridgeport, not the same as the Schaghticoke Indian Tribe, Kent, CT.
 The Southern Pequot Tribe (a.k.a. The Southern Pequot Tribal Nation of Waterford). Letter of Intent to Petition 7/7/1998.
 The Western Pequot Tribal Nation of New Haven, West Haven. Letter of Intent to Petition 11/27/2000.

Delaware

District of Columbia 
Cherokee Tuscarora Nation of Turtle Island

Florida 
 Apalachicola Band of Creek Indians. Letter of Intent to Petition 08/17/2004
 Arkansas White River Cherokee (a.k.a. Chickamauga Cherokee Nation - White River Band (I)). Letter of Intent to Petition 10/22/2003. Despite the Arkansas name, the group is located in Florida. There is also a Chickamauga Cherokee Nation - White River Band (II) and (III) in Oklahoma.
 Binay Tribe
 Chickamauga Cherokee Indian Creek Band
 Choctaws of Florida (a.k.a. Hunter Tsalagi-Choctaw Tribe). Letter of Intent to Petition 03/02/2005. Declined to acknowledge 2013-07-11.
 Choctaw Nation of Florida.
 Church of the Métis Tribe.
 Creeks East of the Mississippi (a.k.a. Principal Creek Indian Nation East of the Mississippi). Letter of Intent to Petition 03/21/1973 (petitioned as part of a State-recognized tribe Lower Muskogee Creek Tribe - East of the Mississippi, Inc., Georgia); declined to Acknowledge 12/21/1981 46 FR 51652, see also 47 FR 14783
 Echota Cherokee Tribe of Florida
 Florida Mockingbird Clan
 Florida Tribe of Cherokee Indians, Inc
 Florida Tribe of Eastern Creeks.
 Indian Creek Band, Chickamauga Creek & Cherokee Inc. Letter of Intent to Petition 02/19/2004.
 Muscogee Nation of Florida (formerly Florida Tribe of Eastern Creek Indians). Letter of Intent to Petition 06/02/1978; awaiting Active Consideration; all documents have been filed with BAR.
 Creek-Euchee Band of Indians of Florida. Letter of Intent to Petition; Receipt of Petition 11/23/1999. Letter of Intent withdrawn 10/20/2000; merged with Florida Tribe of Eastern Creek Indians
 Ocali Nation
 Oklewaha Band of Seminoles.
 Ouachita Indians of Florida and America
 Perdido Bay Tribe of Lower Muscogee Creeks
 Rainbow Tribes
 Red Nation's Intertribal
 Santa Rosa County Creek Indian Tribe, Milton, Florida
 Seminole Nation of Florida (a.k.a. Traditional Seminole).  Letter of Intent to Petition 08/05/1983; referred to SOL for determination 5/25/1990.
 Siwanoy Nation Incorporated, Tampa, FL
 Sovereign Miccosukee Seminole Nation, a.k.a. Everglades Miccosukee Tribe of Seminole Indians.
 Topachula Tribe
 Tuscola United Cherokee Tribe of Florida, Inc. (formerly Tuscola United Cherokees of Florida & Alabama, Inc.). Letter of Intent to Petition 01/19/1979; withdrawn at petitioner's request 11/24/1997; reinstated 2005.
 Wolf Creek Cherokee Tribe, Inc. of Florida. Also in Alabama.

Georgia 
American Cherokee Confederacy (see Southeastern Cherokee Confederacy, Inc. (SECC) below). Known Bands: Horse Band (OK).
Broad River Band of Cherokee.
Cane Break Band of Eastern Cherokees. Letter of Intent to Petition 01/09/1979; rejoined Georgia Tribe of Eastern Cherokees, Inc. (I), notification 7/16/1997
Cherokee Indians of Georgia, Inc.
Chickamauga Cherokee Band of Northwest Georgia.
Georgia Band of Chickasaw Indians (formerly Mississippi Band of Chickasaw Indians). Letter of Intent to Petition 9/15/1998.
Georgia Tribe of Eastern Cherokees, Inc. (II).  This is an unrecognized tribe in Dahlonega, GA, that have the same name as a State-recognized tribe Georgia Tribe of Eastern Cherokees, Inc. (I).
Georgia Tribe of Eastern Cherokees, Inc. (III).  This is an unrecognized tribe that have the same name as a State-recognized tribe Georgia Tribe of Eastern Cherokees, Inc. (I).
Kokeneschv Natchez Nation.
Manahoac Saponi Nation
North Georgia Cherokee Indians.
South-Eastern Indian Nation. Incomplete Letter of Intent to Petition 01/05/1996; Incomplete Letter of Intent withdrawn at petitioner's request 11/10/1997.
Southeastern Cherokee Confederacy, Inc. (SECC) Letter of Intent to Petition 03/09/1978; Declined to Acknowledge 11/25/1985 (50 FR 39047).  Became the American Cherokee Confederacy on 1/31/1996, with a breakaway group Southeastern Cherokee Council, Inc. (SeCCI) forming on the same day. Bands: Northwest Cherokee Wolf Band (OR), Red Clay Intertribal Indian Band (TN).
Southeastern Cherokee Council, Inc. (SeCCI). Also in Michigan. Bands and Clans: Big Lake Eagle Band (AK), Black Wolf Clan (KY), Blue Band (FL), Buffalo Creek Band (TN), Earth Band (PA), Enola Band (NC), Grey Wolf Clan of Ochlocknee (GA), Hummingbird Band (CA), Hummingbird Medicine Band (MO), Little Wolf Band (MI), Long Hair Band (FL), Lost Tribes Band (MI, MN), Many Waters Band (DE, MD), Mountain Band (NC), Myrtlewood Band (OR), Nighthawk Medicine Clan (FL), Northern Lights Band (MN), One Spirit Band (TN), Panther Band (GA), Patoka Valley Band (IN), Red Cedar (VA), Running Horse Band (TX), Tennessee Chota Band (TN), Turtle Band (OK), Turtle Island Band (OH), Turtle Moon Band (FL), Uwharie Band (NC), Wandering Waters Band (MI), Wee Toc Band (NC), Where Rivers Meet Band (MI), Windsong Band (DC (MD)).
Southeastern Indian Nation.
Tama Indian Tribe
Uganawvkalvgv Kituwah Ayeli, also known as Southeast Kituwah Nation.
The United Cherokee Nation (UCN) – Eastern National Office. Also in Arizona.
The United Creeks of Georgia
The Yamassee Native American Moors of the Creek Nation. Letter of Intent to Petition 4/27/1999.

Idaho 
Delawares of Idaho, Inc. Letter of Intent to Petition 06/26/1979. 
Lemhi-Shoshone Tribes was stripped of recognition in 1907.

Illinois 
 Choctaw Nation Mississippi River Clan
 The People of the Mountains. Letter of Intent 6/3/2004.
 Vinyard Indian Settlement of Shawnee Indians. Bill HB3217 proposed for state recognition.

Indiana 
Eel River Tribe Inc. of Indiana. Letter of Intent to Petition 09/13/2006.
Lone Wolf Band of Cherokee Indians.
Miami Nation of Indians of the State of Indiana, Inc. Letter of Intent to Petition 04/02/1980; Declined to Acknowledge 08/17/1992 57 FR 27312.
Northern Cherokee Tribe of Indiana. Letter of Intent to Petition 7/26/1985
United Métis Tribe
Buffalo Spirit Band of the United Métis Tribe
Nimkii Band of the United Métis Tribe
Upper Kispoko Band of the Shawnee Nation. Letter of Intent to Petition 04/10/1991; certified letter returned undeliverable 10/30/1997.
Wea Indian Tribe. Claims re-establishment in 2000 Letter of Intent to Petition 03/21/2007.
Wea Indian Tribe of Indiana. Claims re-establishment in 2004 Letter of Intent to Petition 11/29/2006.
The Zibiodey / River Heart Metis Association/Band

Iowa 
United People of Cherokee Heritage.

Kansas 
Delaware-Muncie Tribe. Letter of Intent to Petition 06/19/1978.
Kaweah Indian Nation, Inc. Also in North Carolina.
Neutral Land Cherokee Group. Also in Missouri.
Northern Cherokee Nation of the Old Louisiana Territory. Located in Arkansas and Missouri
Kanasas (Awi Akta) District of NCNOLT. – Located in Kansas
Oklahoma (Ani Tsi Na) District of the NCNOLT. – Located in Oklahoma.
Red Nation of the Cherokee. Also in Arkansas.
Swan Creek & Black River Chippewas.
United Tribe of Shawnee Indians. Letter of Intent to Petition 07/06/1995.
Wyandot Nation of Kansas. Letter of Intent to Petition 05/12/1994.

Kentucky 
 Black Wolf Clan of SE Cherokee Council, Inc.
 Cherokee Tribe of Kentucky.
 Kentucky Cherokee Heritage Group.
 Southeastern Kentucky Shawnee
 Southern Cherokee Nation of Kentucky.
 Ridgetop Shawnee were first recognized by the Kentucky General Assembly in 2009
 The Tribe of the Whitetop Band of Native Indians

Louisiana 
 Apalachee Indian Tribe,  Alexandra, LA. Letter of Intent to Petition 01/22/1996.
 Atakapa-Ishak Nation, Lake Charles, LA.
 Avogel Nation of Louisiana, Marksville, LA. Letter of Intent to Petition 11/13/2000.
 Avogel, Okla Tasannuk, Tribe/Nation, Duson, LA. Letter of Intent to Petition 03/19/2001.
 Avoyel-Kaskaskia Tribe of Louisiana, Marksville, LA. Letter of Intent to Petition 06/20/2005.
 The Avoyel-Taensa Tribe/Nation of Louisiana Inc., Marksville, LA. Letter of Intent to Petition 01/09/2003. Receipt of Petition 01/09/2003.
 Biloxi, Chitimacha Confederation of Muskogees, Inc., Bourg, LA
 Chahta Tribe.
 Kispoko Sept of Ohio Shawnee.
 Louisiana Choctaw Turtle Tribe.
 Red Shoe Tribe, Kinder, LA. Letter of Intent to Petition 6/21/2010.
 Talimali Band, The Apalachee Indians of Louisiana (formerly Apalachee Indians of Louisiana), Libuse, LA. Letter of Intent to Petition 02/05/1996.

Maine 
Wesget Sipu Inc. Letter of Intent to Petition 6/4/2002. Receipt of Petition 6/4/2002.

Maryland 
 Federation: Moorish Science Temple of America, Inc. Letter of Intent to Petition 01/23/96; determined ineligible to petition 5/15/1997.
 Youghiogaheny River Band Of Shawnee Indians
 Pocomoke Indian Nation, Eden, MD
 Notoweega Nation. Filed with the Maryland Indian Commission for state recognition 6/9/2021.

Massachusetts 
 Assawompsett-Nemasket Band of Wampanoags, Lakeville, MA
 Assonet Band of Wampanoags, New Bedford, MA
 Chappaquiddick Band of Massachusetts, Andover, MA Letter of Intent to Petition 5/31/2007.
 Chappaquiddick Tribe of the Wampanoag Indian Nation, South Yarmouth, MA. Letter of Intent to Petition 05/21/2007.
 Chaubunagungamaug Band of the Nipmuck Nation, Webster/Dudley; Dudley, MA; Grafton, MA. Letter of Intent to Petition 04/22/1980 as part of Nipmuc Nation; separate letter of intent 5/31/1996. Declined to acknowledge on 6/25/2004, 69 FR 35664.
 Council of Seven/Royal House of Pokanoket/Pokanoket Tribe/Wampanoag Nation, Millbury, MA
 Cowasuck Band-Abenaki People, also known as Cowasuck Band of Pennacook Abenaki People, Franklin, MA. Letter of Intent to Petition 01/23/1995.
 Federation of Old Plimoth Indian Tribes, Inc., Plymouth, MA. Letter of Intent to Petition 05/16/2000. Receipt of Petition 05/16/2000.
 Historical Nipmuc Tribe, Webster, MA
 Massachusett Tribe at Ponkapoag, Bridgewater, MA
 Mattakeeset Tribe of the Massachuset Nation, Newton, MA. Also Mattakeeset Massachuset Tribe
 Natick Nipmuc Indian Council, Natick, MA
 New England Coastal Schaghticoke Indian Association and Tribal Council Natick, MA
 Praying Indians of Natick and Ponkapoag, Stoughton, MA
 Quinsigamond Band of the Nipmucs, Worcester, MA
 Rebel Deaf Panther Tribe International, Ashland, MA
 Seaconke Wampanoag Tribe, Seekonk, MA

Michigan 
 Genesee Valley Indian Association
 Grand River Bands of Ottawa Indians (formerly Grand River Band Ottawa Council). Letter of Intent to Petition 10/16/1994.
Lake Superior Chippewa of Marquette. Letter of Intent to Petition 12/13/1991.
Little Owl Band of Central Michigan Indians, Sidney. Letter of Intent to Petition 11/27/2000.
Maconce Village Band of Ojibwa. Letter of Intent to Petition 03/07/2000. Receipt of Petition 3/7/2000.
Maple River Band of Ottawa. Letter of Intent to Petition 01/31/2005.
Muskegon River Band of Ottawa Indians. Letter of Intent to Petition 07/26/2002. Receipt of Petition 07/26/2002.
Ooragnak Indian Nation. Letter of Intent to Petition 12/1/1999. Receipt of Petition 12/01/1999.
Southeastern Cherokee Council, Inc. (SeCCI). Also in Georgia.
The Chi-cau-gon Band of Lake Superior Chippewa of Iron County. Letter of Intent to Petition 02/12/1998.
 Wyandot of Anderdon Nation LLC. Letter of Intent to Petition 01/21/2003. Receipt of Petition 01/21/2003. Also in Ontario.

Minnesota 
Kah-Bay-Kah-Nong (a.k.a. Gabekanaang Anishinaabeg/Warroad Chippewa), Letter of Intent to Petition 2/12/1979; Postal service returned certified letter 10/30/1997.
Kettle River Band of the St. Croix Chippewa of Minnesota. Currently recognized only as part of the Mille Lacs Band of Ojibwe.
Mendota Mdewakanton Dakota Community. Letter of Intent to Petition 4/11/1996.
Ni-Mi-Win Ojibways
Rice Lake Band of Mississippi Ojibwe. Currently recognized only as part of the Mille Lacs Band of Ojibwe.
Sandy Lake Band of Mississippi Chippewa, petitioned for independent federal recognition and independent state recognition.  Currently recognized only as part of the Mille Lacs Band of Ojibwe.
Snake and Knife Rivers Band of the St. Croix Chippewa of Minnesota. Currently recognized only as part of the Mille Lacs Band of Ojibwe.
St. Croix Chippewa of Minnesota. Currently recognized only as part of the Mille Lacs Band of Ojibwe.

Mississippi 
 Grand Village Natchez Indian Tribe
 Mississippi Choctaw Indian Federation (defunct historic organization)
 Vancleave Live Oak Choctaw, Vancleave, MS. Letter of Intent to Petition 06/14/2006. State law MS HR50 in 2016 declared this organization "The Official Native American Tribe of the Choctaw People of Jackson County, Mississippi"

Missouri 

Ahi Ni Yv Wiya, Inc.
Amonsoquath Band of Cherokee.
Amonsoquath Tribe of Cherokee. Letter of Intent to Petition 02/17/1995. Also in California.
Cherokee Nation West of Missouri & Arkansas (formerly Cherokee Nation West - Southern Band of the Eastern Cherokee Indians of Arkansas and Missouri). Letter of Intent to Petition 5/11/1998. Also in Arkansas.
Chickamauga Cherokee Nation.
Dogwood Band of Free Cherokees.
Lost Cherokee of Arkansas & Missouri. Letter of Intent to Petition 02/10/1999; letter returned, marked "in dispute" between two different addresses. Also in Arkansas.
Neutral Land Cherokee Group. Also in Kansas.
Northern Cherokee Nation. Dissoved into three groups:
Chickamauga Cherokee Nation (I), also known as Chickamauga Cherokee Nation MO/AR White River Band and as White River Band of Chickamauga Cherokee Nation of Missouri and Arkansas. Also in Arkansas and Oklahoma. There is also a Chickamauga Cherokee Nation White River Band (II) in Oklahoma.
Northern Cherokee Nation of the Old Louisiana Territory. Letter of Intent to Petition 2/19/1992. Also in Arkansas.
Kanasas (Awi Akta) District of NCNOLT.
Oklahoma (Ani Tsi Na) District of the NCNOLT.
Northern Cherokee Tribe of Indians of Missouri and Arkansas. Letter of Intent to Petition 07/26/1985. Also in Arkansas.
Ozark Mountain Cherokee Tribe of Arkansas and Missouri. Letter of Intent to Petition 10/19/1999. Receipt of Petition 10/19/1999. Also in Arkansas.
Sac River and White River Bands of the Chickamauga-Cherokee Nation of Arkansas and Missouri Inc. (formerly Northern Chickamauga Cherokee Nation of Arkansas and Missouri). Letter of Intent to Petition 09/05/1991. Also in Arkansas.
Saponi Nation of Missouri (Mahenips Band). Letter of Intent to Petition 12/14/1999. Receipt of Petition 12/14/1999.
Southern Cherokee Indian Tribe. Letter of Intent to Petition 12/01/2006.
Western Cherokee.
Western Cherokee of Arkansas/Louisiana Territories. Letter of Intent to Petition 10/05/2001. Receipt of Petition 10/05/2001. Also in Arkansas.
Western Cherokee Nation of Arkansas and Missouri. Letter of Intent to Petition 05/01/1998. Also in Arkansas.
The Wilderness Tribe of Missouri. Letter of Intent to Petition 8/16/1999.

Montana 
Ahon-to-ays Ojibwa Band (a.k.a. Rocky Boy Ojibway Band). Incomplete letter of Intent to Petition 2/1/1996.
Swan Creek & Black River Chippewa

Nevada 
Pahrump Band of Paiutes, Letter of Intent to Petition 11/9/1987.

New Hampshire 
Abenaki Indian Center, Inc.
Abenaki Nation of New Hampshire
Pennacook New Hampshire Tribe
Ko'asek (Co'wasuck)Traditional Band of the Sovereign Abenaki Nation

New Jersey 
 Cherokee Nation of New Jersey
 Eagle Medicine Band of Cherokee Indians, also in Pennsylvania
 New Jersey Sand Hill Band of Indians (also known as Sand Hill Band of Lenape and Cherokee Indians or Sand Hill Band of Indians). Letter of Intent to Petition 01/09/2007.
 Osprey Band of Free Cherokees
 Powhatan Renape Nation, Rancocas, NJ
 Unalachtigo Band of Nanticoke Lenni-Lenape Indians. Letter of Intent to Petition 2/1/2002.
 Schèjachbi Wonameys, NJ Lenni Lenape Nation.

New Mexico 
Canoncito Band of Navajos, petitioned for independent federal recognition 07/31/1989. Note: this is a Chapter (governing unit) of the Navajo Nation.
 Chiricahua Apache Nation, also Chiricahua Apache Nde Nation, based in Santa Clara, New Mexico
 Genízaro. In 2007, the Genízaros received New Mexico state legislative recognition as an indigenous group. Although New Mexico's Legislative Memorial bills do not have the force of law, HM 40 and SM 59 formally acknowledge the legislative desire to recognize the Genízaros as an indigenous group.  Genizaro communities were granted permanent settlements by Spanish officials in the 18th Century and were given federal land patents to their lands by the United States Government through the Court of Private Land Claims.  Genizaro communities such as the Pueblo de Abiquiu, Cañon de Carnue(l), and San Miguel del Vado have self governed under state statute since New Mexico became a state in 1912; and prior under Spanish and Mexican law.  Genizaro communities have refused to seek federal recognition, rather they stand by the United Nations Resolution on Indigenous Declaration on Rights of Indigenous Peoples, a resolution to which the U.S. is a party, “Self-Identification as indigenous or tribal shall be regarded as a fundamental criterion for determining the groups which the provisions of this Convention apply”.   
 Piro/Manso/Tiwa Indian Tribe of the Pueblo of San Juan de Guadalupe. Letter of Intent to Petition 01/18/1971.
 Piro/Manso/Tiwa Tribe of Guadalupe Pueblo (a.k.a. Tiwa Indian Tribe). Letter of Intent to Petition 12/17/2002. Receipt of Petition 12/17/2002.
 Mazewalli Nation, unrecognized group claiming to represent Mesoamerican diaspora in New Mexico

New York 
 Cherokee-Blackfeet.
 The Chickamauga Notowega Creeks, Staten Island. Letter of Intent to Petition 03/19/2001.
 Deer Council of Free Cherokees.
 Hudson River Band (formerly Konkapot Band, Hudson Valley Band). Letter of Intent to Petition 04/19/2002. Receipt of Petition 04/19/2002.
 Matinecock Tribal Nation
 Mohawk Nation Akwesasne Mohawk Territory
 Mohawk Reservation
 Montauk Indian Nation (a.k.a. Montaukett Indian Nation of New York). Letter of Intent to Petition 07/31/1995.
 Montaukett Tribe of Long Island. Letter of Intent to Petition 03/16/1998.
 North-Eastern Band of Cherokee Indians.
 Nuy Keetoowah, Inc.
 Ohatchee Cherokee Tribe of New York and Alabama. Letter of Intent to Petition 12/16/2002. Receipt of Petition 12/16/2002.
 Western Mohegan Tribe & Nation of New York. Letter of Intent to Petition 1/27/1997.

North Carolina 
 Cherokee Indians of Hoke County, Inc. (a.k.a. Tuscarora Hoke Co.), Lumber Bridge, NC. Letter of Intent to Petition 09/20/1983; determined ineligible to petition (SOL opinion of 10/23/1989).
 Cherokee Indians of Red Banks, Robeson and Adjoining Counties, Red Springs, NC. Letter of Intent to Petition 02/01/1979; determined ineligible to petition (SOL opinion of 10/23/1989).
 Chicora-Siouan Indian People, Letter of Intent to Petition 02/10/1993. Also in South Carolina.
 Chowanoke Indian Nation, formerly the Meherrin-Chowanoke, Winton, NC
 Coree Indians (a.k.a. Faircloth Indians), Atlantic, NC. Letter of Intent to Petition 08/05/1978.
 Creek-Cherokee Indians, Pine Tree Clan.
 Cumberland County Association for Indian People
 Eno-Occaneechi Tribe of Indians, Mebane, NC. Letter of Intent to Petition 11/24/1997.
 Free Cherokee.
 Four Hole Indian Organization, Letter of Intent to Petition 12/30/1976. Also in South Carolina.
 Guilford Native American Association
 Hattadare Indian Nation, Bunnlevel, NC. Letter of Intent to Petition 03/16/1979.
 Hatteras Tuscarora Indians, Maxton, NC Letter of Intent to Petition 06/24/1978: determined ineligible to petition (SOL opinion of 10/23/1989). Merged with Tuscarora Nation East of the Mountains, 3/22/2004.
 Kaweah Indian Nation, Inc., Oriental, NC. Letter of Intent to Petition 04/28/1980; certified letter returned by P.O. 10/1997; Declined to Acknowledge 06/10/1985 (50 FR 14302). Also in Kansas.
 Meherrin Indian Tribe (II). Letter of Intent to Petition 06/27/1995. There is a State-recognized tribe with the same name, Meherrin Indian Tribe (I).
 Ne'Ha-Tsunii Indian Nation
 Nee Tribe (a.k.a. Nuluti Equani Ehi Tribe and Near River Dwellers), East Bend, NC
 Ridge Band of Cherokees, Ridgecraft, NC
 Roanoke-Hatteras Indian Tribe, Elizabeth City, NC, formerly the Roanoke-Hatteras Indians of Dare County. Letter of Intent to Petition 03/10/2004.
 Santee Tribe, White Oak Community. Letter of Intent to Petition 06/04/1979
 Santee Tribe
 Southeastern Cherokee Confederacy, Four Oaks, NC
 Southeastern Cherokee Confederacy, Silver Cloud Clan.
 Summerville Indian Group. Also in South Carolina.
 Tsalagi Nation Early Emigrants 1817, Durham, NC. Letter of Intent to Petition 07/30/2002. Receipt of Petition 07/30/2002.
 Tuscarora Indian Tribe, Drowning Creek Reservation, Maxton, NC. Letter of Intent to Petition 02/25/1981; determined ineligible to petition (SOL opinion of 10/23/1989). Group formally dissolved and Department notified group 02/19/1997.
 Tuscarora Nation of Indians of the Carolinas, Charlotte, NC. Letter of Intent to Petition 12/21/2004.
 Tuscarora Nation of North Carolina, Maxton, NC. Letter of Intent to Petition 11/19/1985; determined ineligible to petition (SOL opinion of 10/23/1989).
 Tuscarora Nation East of the Mountains, Bowland, NC. Letter of Intent to Petition 09/08/1999.
 United Lumbee Nation of North Carolina and America. Letter of Intent to Petition 4/28/1980; Denied federal recognition 07/02/1985.  Also in California. Not to be confused with the Lumbee Tribe of North Carolina, a state-recognized tribe.

North Dakota 
Christian Pembina Chippewa Indians. Letter of Intent to Petition 6/26/1984.
Little Shell Band of the North Dakota Tribe (a.k.a. Little Shell Pembina Band of North America). Letter of Intent to Petition 11/11/1975.

Ohio 
Alleghenny Nation Indian Center (Ohio Band) (I), also known as the Allegheny-Lenape Indian Council of Ohio. Letter of Intent to Petition 11/03/1979. Supposedly had provisional State Recognition for a year, but failed to produce necessary documentation for an official State Recognition.
Alleghenny Nation Indian Center (Ohio Band) (II). Letter of Intent to Petition 6/02/2005. Possibly broke away from Alleghenny Nation Indian Center (Ohio Band) (I) located 1 mile away.
Cherokee Delaware Indian Center.
Cherokee United Intertribal Indian Council.
Chickamauga Keetoowah Unami Band of Cherokee.
Chickamauga Keetoowah Unami Wolf Band of Cherokee Delaware Shawnee of Ohio, West Virginia & Virginia. Letter of Intent to Petition 08/28/2006.
Eastern Cherokee Nation, Overhill Band.
Etowah Cherokee Nation.
Free Cherokee, Four Direction Council.
Free Cherokee, Hokshichanklya Band.
Kispoko Sept of Ohio Shawnee (Hog Creek Reservation).
Lower Eastern Ohio Mekojay Shawnee, Wilmington. Letter of Intent to Petition 3/5/2001.
Mekoce Shawnee.
Morning Star Shawnee Nation.
 Munsee Delaware Indian Nation—USA, formerly known incorrectly as the "Munsee-Thames River Delaware" and as "Munsee Delaware Indian Nation". On June 20, 2013, Official State Recognition was granted by Governor John Kasich by authority of the State of Ohio by Gubernatorial Decree and also by the Mayor of the city of Columbus, Ohio and both Ohio U.S. Senators, Members of the House of Representatives, Director of Minority Affairs, State of Ohio, USDA Reps., Directors of the Ohio Historical Society, Franklinton Historical Society and other government officials.{} All commemorating and affirming the 200th anniversary of the "Friendship Treaty," also known as the Harrison-Tarhe Peace Conference (2nd Treaty of Greenville, 1814), with the tribe. The tribe is under the authority of Congress by the Greenville Treaty of 1795, the 1805 Treaty, the 1809 and 1913-14 treaties. These PRECEDE the Bureau of Indian Affairs by 13 years and have never been adjudicated and remain in force and effect.
North Eastern U.S. Miami Inter-Tribal Council. Letter of Intent to Petition 04/09/1979.
Notoweega Nation. Also known as the Ohio Woodlands Tribe.
The Nottoway in Ohio. Letter of Intent to Petition 07/03/2008.
Piqua Sept of Ohio Shawnee Indians. Letter of Intent to Petition 04/16/1991. the Piqua Shawnee Tribe - officially recognized in Alabama by the Alabama Indian Affairs Commission via the authority of the Strong-Davis Act and in Ohio by Ohio Senate Resolution 188, adopted February 26, 1991 and by the Ohio House of Representatives 119th General Assembly Resolution No. 83, adopted April 3, 1991 as presented to the Bureau of Indian Affairs Washington D.C., and in Kentucky by Governor's Proclamation dated August 13, 1991
Saponi Nation of Ohio. Letter of Intent to Petition 9/25/1997. They were recognized by several Ohio resolutions that were passed including between 2001-2004, and in 2019 but it was never made permanent, as Ohio doesn't have a recognition process.
Shawnee Nation, Ohio Blue Creek Band of Adams County. Letter of Intent to Petition 8/5/1998.
Tallige Cherokee Nation, Fire Clan.
 Tutelo Nahyssan Tribal Nation. Letter of Intent to Petition 7/27/2005.
 Tutelo-Saponi Tribal Nation (formerly known as Pine Hill Saponi Tribal Nation). Letter of Intent to Petition 10/1/2002.
 United Remnant Band of the Shawnee Nation; The Ohio General Assembly held hearings and heard testimony from numerous groups. This legislature passed a joint resolution in 1979-1980 recognizing the United Remnant Band as an Indian tribe descended from the historic Shawnee.

Oklahoma 
Canadian River Band of the Southern Cherokee Nation.
Cataba Tribal Association
Chickamauga Cherokee Nation White River Band (II). There is also a Chickamauga Cherokee Nation White River Band (I) in Arkansas, Missouri and Oklahoma.
Northern Cherokee Nation of the Old Louisiana Territory. State-recognized in Missouri, but unrecognized in Arkansas and elsewhere.
 Kanasas (Awi Akta) District of NCNOLT. – Located in Kansas
 Oklahoma (Ani Tsi Na) District of the NCNOLT. – Located in Oklahoma.
 Northern Cherokee Tribe of Indians.
 Northern Chickamaunga Cherokee Nation of Arkansas and Missouri. Letter of Intent to Petition 9/5/1991
 Sac River and White River Bands of the Chickamauga Cherokee Nation of Arkansas and Missouri, Inc., Chandler, OK Also Chickamauga Cherokee Nation (I), also known as Chickamauga Cherokee Nation MO/AR White River Band and as White River Band of Chickamauga Cherokee Nation of Missouri and Arkansas. Also in Arkansas and Missouri. There is also a Chickamauga Cherokee Nation White River Band (II) in Oklahoma.
 Southeastern Cherokee Confederacy, Horse Clan.
 Southern Cherokee Nation.
 United Band of the Western Cherokee Nation. Letter of Intent to Petition 3/14/2003.
 Yuchi Tribal Organization, Letter of Intent to Petition 10/05/1990; Declined to acknowledge 3/21/2000, 64 FR 71814. , part of the federally recognized Muscogee (Creek) Nation.
Yuchi (Euchee) Tribe of Oklahoma located in Sapulpa, Oklahoma, is part of the federally recognized Muscogee (Creek) Nation.

Oregon 
Celilio-Wyam Indian Community
The Cherokee Delaware Tribe of the Northwest
Chetco Tribe
Clatsop-Nehalem Confederated Tribes
Confederated Tribes: Rogue, Table Rock & Associated Tribes; Letter of Intent to Petition 3/24/1997; properly executed Letter of Intent 6/19/1997
Northwest Cherokee Deer Clan
Northwest Cherokee Wolf and Paint Clan
Northwest Cherokee Wolf Band of the Southeastern Cherokee Confederacy; Letter of Intent to Petition 03/09/1978; Declined to Acknowledge 11/25/1985 50 FR 39047
Tchinouk Indians; Letter of Intent to Petition 05/16/1979; Declined to Acknowledge 03/17/1986, 51 FR 2437
Tolowa-Tututni Tribe; also in California

Pennsylvania 
 Conestoga-Susquehannock Tribe
 Eastern Delaware Nations.
 Free Cherokee-Chickamauga.
 Lena'pe Nation.
 Eastern Lenape Nation of Pennsylvania. Letter of Intent to Petition 05/16/2000.
 Lenape Nation of Pennsylvania, Easton, PA
 Southeastern Cherokee Confederacy of Pennsylvania.
 Thunder Mountain Lenapé Nation, Saltsburg, PA
 Tsalagi Elohi Cherokee Earth.
 United Cherokee Tribe of West Virginia. Also in South Carolina and West Virginia.
 White Path Society.

Puerto Rico 

 Concilio Taino Guatu-Ma-Cu A Boriken (Puerto Rico)
 Jatibonicu Taino Tribal Nation of Boriken. (Puerto Rico).
 Liga Guakia Taina ke (Our Taino Land)
 Maisiti Yukayeke Taino
 Naguake Indigenous Base Community
 Taino-Boricua Nation
Consejo General de Tainos Boricanos
 Turabo Taino Indian Nation in Puerto Rico

Rhode Island 
 Aquidneck Indian Council
 Northern Narragansett Indian Tribe of Rhode Island: Nonprofit Entity with NAICS code 921150 - "American Indian and Alaska Native Tribal Governments".
 Pokanoket Tribe of the Wampanoag Nation, Bristol, RI. Letter of Intent to Petition 10/05/1994 for Federal Recognition. State recognition attempted for the tribe with the introduction of State of Rhode Island House Bill 2006--H 7236, but the bill was never passed. Also in Massachusetts.
 Pokanoket-Wampanoag Federation: Wampanoag Nation/Pokanoket Tribe and Bands. Letter of intent to petition 1/5/1998.
 Rhode Island Indian Council
 Seaconke Wampanoag Tribe, Providence, RI. Letter of Intent to Petition 10/29/1998.
 Wappinger Tribal Nation. Letter of Intent to Petition 7/7/2003.
 Wiquapaug Eastern Pequot Tribe. Letter of Intent to Petition 09/15/2000. Receipt of Petition 09/15/2000.

South Carolina 
South Carolina recognizes some Native American entities as groups or special interest organizations, but not as tribes.

 American Indian Center of South Carolina.
 Broad River Band of Cherokee.
 Carolina Indian Heritage Association.
 Chaloklowa Chickasaw Indian People, Hemingway, SC, a state-recognized group, but not a state-recognized tribe
 Cherokee Bear Clan of South Carolina.
 Cherokees of South Carolina.
 Chicora Indian Tribe of South Carolina (formerly Chicora-Siouan Indian People). Letter of Intent to Petition 02/10/1993. Also in North Carolina.
 The Chicora-Waccamaw Indian People. Letter of Intent to Petition 10/05/1994.
 Croatan Indian Tribe of South Carolina, Orangeburg, SC
 Eastern Cherokee, Southern Iroquois & United Tribes of South Carolina, Inc., Duncan, SC, a state-recognized group, but not a state-recognized tribe
 Edisto Indian Organization of South Carolina (also known as Edisto Indian Tribe).
 Four Hole Indian Organization, Edisto Tribal Council. Letter of Intent to Petition 12/30/1976. Also in North Carolina.
 Fields Indian Family – Pine Hill Indian Community.
 Free Cherokee-Chickamauga
 Horse Creek Indian Heritage Association.
 Little Horse Creek American Indian Association.
 Marlboro & Chesterfield Pee Dee Band (a.k.a. Upper Pee Dee Nation of South Carolina)
 Midlands Intertribal Empowerment Group.
 Natchez Tribe of South Carolina, Columbia, SC, a state-recognized group, but not a state-recognized tribe
 Paia Lower Eastern Cherokee Nation.
 Pee Dee Indian Association. Letter of Intent to Petition 01/30/1995.
 Pee Dee Indian Nation of Beaver Creek, Neeses, SC, a state-recognized group, but not a state-recognized tribe
 Pine Hill Indian Community Development Initiative, North, SC, state-recognized special interest organization but not state-recognized tribe
 Santee Indian Nation.
 Summerville Indian Group. Also in North Carolina.
 Sumter Band of Cheraw Indians.
 United Cherokee Tribe of West Virginia. Also in Pennsylvania and West Virginia.
 Waccamaw Siouan Indian Association. Letter of Intent to Petition 10/16/1992; Postal service returned certified letter 11/5/1997.

Tennessee 

 Central Band of Cherokee whose headquarters is in Lawrenceburg, Tennessee declined to acknowledge 2012-07-24 
 Cherokee Wolf Clan whose headquarters is in Yuma, Tennessee
 Chikamaka Band whose headquarters is in Tracy City, Tennessee 
 Etowah Cherokee Nation (I). Letter of Intent to Petition 12/31/1990; certified letter returned undeliverable 10/1997.  The recognition of this group, which operated out of Cleveland, Tennessee, is denied by the state legislature, contesting the authority of a Proclamation of Recognition by the Governor of Tennessee of 25 May 25, 1978.
 Remnant Yuchi Nation whose headquarters is in Kingsport, Tennessee 
 Tanasi Council, whose headquarters is in Memphis, Tennessee
 United Eastern Lenape Nation of Winfield, Tennessee
United Aniyunwiya Nation in Memphis, Tennessee
Mennefer Tanasi (Wob) Native American Tribe in Memphis Tennessee

Texas 
 Absentee Seminole Tribe of Texas,
 American Cherokee Tribe of Texas
 Apache Council of Texas, San Antonio, TX
 The Arista Indian Village. Letter of Intent to Petition 05/21/2002 Receipt of Petition 05/21/2002
 Atakapas Ishak Nation of Southeast Texas and Southwest Louisiana. Letter of Intent to Petition 02/02/2007
 Carrizo/Comecrudo Nation of Texas, also Tribal Council of the Carrizo/Comecrudo Nation of Texas. Letter of Intent to Petition 07/06/1998.
 Cherokee Nation of Mexico, based in Dripping Springs, Texas
 Cherokee Nation of Texas, Limited.
 Chickamauga Cherokee Brushy Creek Band.
 Comanche Penateka Tribe. Letter of Intent to Petition 04/03/1998.
 Court of the Golden Eagle, The Oukah.
 Creek Indians of Texas at Red Oak
 Cuelgahen Nde Lipan Apache of Texas, Three Rivers, TX
 Free Cherokee, Hummingbird Clan
 Jumano Tribe (West Texas) (formerly The People of LaJunta (Jumano/Mescalero)). Letter of Intent to Petition 03/26/1997.
 Karankawa Kadla
 Lipan Apache Band of Texas, Brackettville, TX
 Lipan Apache Nation of Texas, San Antonio, TX. Also known as the Kuné Tsa Nde Band of the Lipan Apache Nation of Texas
 Lipan Apache Tribe of Texas, McAllen, TX. Also known as Lipan Apache Tribe. Texas Senate Bill 27, introduced in January 2021, to formally recognize this group died in committee.
 Miakan-Garza Band, also Mier Band of the Garza Tribe, in San Marcos, Texas; created the Indigenous Cultures Institute in 2006.
 Mount Tabor Indian Community. Also known as Texas Cherokees and Associate Bands-Mount Tabor Indian Community.
 Nato Indian Nation (Native American Tribal Organization), Grand Prairie, TX, also in Utah
 Pamaque Clan of Coahuila y Tejas Spanish Indian Colonial Missions Inc. Letter of Intent to Petition 04/23/2002; Receipt of Petition 04/23/2002. BAR Papers filed 2005.
 Southeastern Cherokee Confederacy, Hawk Clan
 Southeastern Cherokee Confederacy, Sequoyah Clan
 Southeastern Cherokee Tribe and Associated Bands.
 Sovereign Cherokee Nation Tejas
 Tap Pilam: The Coahuiltecan Nation Letter of Intent to Petition 12/03/1997.
 Texas Band of Yaqui Indians
 Texas Buffalo Bayou Band of Chickamaugan Cherokee, Southern Cherokee Nation.
 Texas Gulf Coast Cherokee and Associated Bands
 Tsalagiyi Nvdagi Tribe. Based in Waco, Texas.
 United Chickamaugan
 United Mascogo Seminole Tribe of Texas. Letter of Intent to Petition 12/31/2002. Receipt of Petition 12/31/2002.
 The Yanaguana Bands of Mission Indians of Texas. Letter of Intent to Petition 10/19/2004.

Utah 
 Cherokee Indian Descendents Organization of the Ani-Yun-Wiya.
 Colorado River Band of the Southern Cherokee Nation.
 Nato Indian Nation (Native American Tribal Organization), Provo, Utah, also in Texas
Northeast Band of Shoshone Indians
Rocky Mountain Band of Cherokee Descendents - Magna.
White Mesa Ute Council

Vermont 
 Free Cherokee, Tribal Council.
 Green Mountain Band of Cherokee.
 Sunray Meditation Society.

Virginia 
 American Indigenous Accawmacke Indians, Cape Charles, VA
 Ani-Stohini/Unami Nation. Letter of Intent to Petition 07/08/1994.
 Appalachian Cherokee Nation.
 Buffalo Ridge Cherokees.
 Cherokee of Virginia Birdtown.
 Free Cherokees Spider Clan.
 Halooie Indian Tribe, Seminary Hill area of Alexandria, VA.
 Inagel Tsalagi, Cherokee of Virginia.
 Northern Tsalagi Indian Nation.
 Rappahannock Indian Tribe (II), Change. Letter of Intent to Petition 01/31/2001. Shares a name with a state-recognized tribe Rappahannock Indian Tribe (I).
 Southern Cherokee Confederacy, Pine Log Clan.
 Turtle Band of Cherokee.
 United Cherokee Indian Tribe of Virginia. Letter of Intent to Petition 08/03/2000. Receipt of Petition 07/31/2000.
 Wicocomico Indian Nation (a.k.a. Historic Wicocomico Indian Nation of Northumberland County, Virginia). Letter of Intent to Petition 09/15/2000. Receipt of Petition 08/28/2000.
 Wolf Creek Cherokee Tribe, 501(c)(3) in Henrico County, Virginia
 Wolf Creek Cherokee Indian Tribe of Virginia. Failed bill introduced to Virginia for state-recognition 1/19/2015

Virgin Islands 
 Opia Carib Indian Tribe in U.S Virgin Islands (St. Thomas)
 Carib-Taino Tribal Confederacy

Washington 
Anisahani Blue Clan.
Chinook Indian Tribe of Oregon & Washington, Inc. (a.k.a. Chinook Nation) Letter of Intent to Petition 07/23/1979; Declined to acknowledge 7/12/2003, 67 FR 46204. Also in Oregon.
Duwamish Indian Tribe. Letter of Intent to Petition 06/07/1977; Declined to Acknowledge 05/08/2002 (66 FR 49966).
Free Cherokees, Four Directions Council.
Kikiallus Indian Nation
Marietta Band of Nooksacks
Mitchell Bay Band of the San Juan Islands
 Noo-Wha-Ha Band
 Snohomish Tribe of Indians. Letter of Intent to Petition 03/13/1975; Declined to Acknowledge 03/05/2004 68 FR 68942.
Snoqualmoo Tribe of Whidbey Island. Letter of Intent to Petition 06/14/1988.
 Steilacoom Tribe of Indians. Letter of Intent to Petition 08/28/1974; Proposed Finding 02/07/2000. Declined Acknowledgment effective 6/17/2008 73 FR 14833.

West Virginia 
 Monican Indian Nation. Letter of Intent to Petition 8/23/2007.
 United Cherokee Tribe of West Virginia. Letter of Intent to Petition 12/30/2005. Also in Pennsylvania and South Carolina.
 Notoweega Nation.

Wisconsin 
Brothertown Indians of Wisconsin. Letter of Intent to Petition 04/15/1980. declined to acknowledge 2012-12-11
Muhheconnuck and Munsee Tribes. Letter of Intent to Petition 06/04/2003.
Southern Cherokee Confederacy, Wisconsin.

Wyoming 
Northwestern Shoshoni

See also 
United States
 Federally recognized tribes
 Native Americans in the United States
 List of Alaska Native tribal entities
 List of Indian reservations in the United States
 List of historical Indian reservations in the United States
 National Park Service Native American Heritage Sites
 Outline of United States federal Indian law and policy
 State recognized tribes in the United States

Canada
 List of Indian reserves in Canada
 List of First Nations governments
 List of First Nations peoples
 Non-status Indian

References

External links 
BIA list of petitioners for recognition by state as of 22 September 2008
BIA status summary of petitions for recognition as of 15 February 2007
 Joint resolution of the Cherokee Nation and the Eastern Band of Cherokee Indians opposing fabricated Cherokee "Tribes" and "Indians"
 Testimony of Leon Jones, Principal Chief of the Eastern Band of Cherokee Indians, and Dan McCoy, Tribal Council Chairman, on the Indian Federal Recognition Administrative Procedures Act of 1999

 
Native American law
Native American-related lists